Luis Torres (born April 15, 1992, in Jalpa de Méndez, Tabasco, Mexico) is a Mexican professional footballer who plays for Tapachula of Ascenso MX.

External links

Liga MX players
Living people
Footballers from Tabasco
1992 births
Association footballers not categorized by position
Mexican footballers